FC Florida U23, formerly known as Treasure Coast Tritons, North County United and South Florida Surf, is an American soccer club that plays in USL League Two.

In January 2016, it was announced that the club had been granted a franchise license for the Premier Development League.

Year-by-year

References 

Soccer clubs in Florida
Association football clubs established in 2016
Soccer clubs in South Florida
Sports Clubs Palm Beach County
2016 establishments in Florida
Treasure Coast